Siti Hardiyanti Rukmana (born 23 January 1949), known as Tutut Suharto, is an Indonesian politician who is the eldest daughter of former Indonesian president Suharto and the wife of Global Mediacom (then known as Bimantara Citra) co-founder and former RCTI's commissioner Indra Rukmana.

Business career
Tutut built part of her fortune as a major shareholder of the Citra Lamtoro Gung Group, with interests in more than 90 companies ranging from telecommunications to infrastructure, including tollway projects in Indonesia, Myanmar and the Philippines. Most of Indonesia’s toll roads were built and operated by the stateowned firm Jasa Marga, with untold markups and opportunities for skimming and theft for oligarchs as the projects were completed. In 1989, Suharto issued a decree granting his daughter Tutut 75% of profits from all toll roads her group operated jointly with Jasa Marga, driving costs up still further. Time magazine in a May 1999 cover story titled Suharto Inc. estimated her wealth at $700 million.

In January 2000, the Indonesian Bank Restructuring Agency (IBRA) confiscated land assets valued at Rp 216.8 billion of PT Sinar Slipi Sejahtera (SSS) and owned by Tutut. The land has been mortgaged by PT SSS to Bapindo as collateral. On February 19, 2001, Tutut was banned from leaving Indonesia for one year due to corruption allegations. The legal move on Indonesia's former first family was due to a promise by President Abdurrahman Wahid to prosecute those responsible for corruption during Suharto's 32 years in power.

Political career
Tutut served as deputy chairperson of Golkar from 1993–98. Suharto appointed her as Social Affairs Minister in March 1998 in his short-lived final cabinet. It was believed he had been grooming her as his successor. Following Suharto's fall in May 1998, Golkar in July announced it had recalled Tutut, her brothers Bambang Trihatmodjo and Hutomo 'Tommy' Mandala Putra and Bambang's wife Halimah from the People's Consultative Assembly (MPR).

Golkar officials in 2008 said they would not object to Suharto's children, especially Tutut, rejoining the party's board, provided they were not involved in any outstanding legal cases. Golkar Deputy Secretary General Rully Chairul Anwar said Tutut, Bambang Trihatmodjo and their sister Titiek Suharto were still listed as Golkar members albeit as non-active members.

Presidential aspirations
Tutut planned to run for the presidency in the 2004 presidential election on the ticket of the Concern for the Nation Functional Party (PKPB). But she was ineligible to run because of PKPB's poor performance in the 2004 general election. The party won only 2.1% of the popular vote, giving it just two seats in the House of Representatives (DPR). At that time, political parties needed to receive at least 5% of the popular vote or 3% of seats in the DPR to field a presidential candidate, or they could form a coalition with other parties. The election was ultimately won by former General Susilo Bambang Yudhoyono, defeating popular incumbent Megawati Soekarnoputri.

In Indonesia's 2009 general election, PKPB won only 1.4% of the popular vote, losing its two seats in parliament and failing to qualify for the 2014 general election.

Honours
  Star of Mahaputera, 4th Class (11 August 1997)

References

Further reading
 (2004) Mbak Tutut : Hj. Siti Hardiyanti Rukmana : membangun bangsa menuju ketenteraman dan kesejahteraan rakyat. Jakarta: Institute for Justice and Peace

1949 births
Living people
Javanese people
Indonesian Muslims
Cendana family
Suharto family and associates
Indonesian socialites
Children of national leaders